Herzog or Herzog, Fox & Ne'eman ("HFN") is a full-service commercial law firm located in Tel Aviv, Israel. As of 2019, the firm employs over 378 lawyers, of whom more than 130 are partners.

History
The firm was founded in 1972 by three prominent lawyers: 
 Chaim Herzog, later to become Israeli Ambassador to the United Nations, member of the Israeli Knesset and finally the sixth President of the State of Israel; 
 Michael Fox, who established a successful London law firm before immigrating to Israel, known for his corporate work and his legal contributions to the development of the infrastructure, energy and natural resources of Israel;
 Dr. Ya'akov Ne'eman, author of numerous publications on tax law and respected tax advisor to the government and major local and foreign corporations, later serving as Israeli Minister of Finance and Minister of Justice.

The firm joined Ius Laboris, the international law firm network, in 2012.

Areas of expertise
The firm's expertise covers the following areas:

 Corporate
 Capital Markets and Securities
 Commercial law
 High Tech
 Mergers & Acquisitions
 Privatisation and Restructuring
 Banking and Finance
 Banking Regulation and Finance Law
 Corporate Finance
 Insolvency and Restructuring
 Investment Banking
 Project Finance
 Derivatives and Financial Instruments
 Tax Law
 Investment Funds / Private Equity
 Corporate Tax
 Employee Tax Benefits
 Private Clients, Trusts and Estates
 International Tax Planning
 Transfer Pricing 

 Litigation/Dispute Resolution
 Arbitration & ADR
 Class Actions
 Commercial Litigation
 Corporate and Securities Litigation
 Regulatory/Governmental
 Administrative Law
 
 Corporate Compliance
 White-collar Crime
 Public International Law
 Telecommunications and Media
 Antitrust & Competition
 Real Estate and Construction Law
 Environment and Climate Change

Sectors and Industries:

 Charities, Non-Profit Organisations and NGOs
 Defence, Aerospace and Homeland Security
 Employee Benefits / Executive Compensation
 Energy and Natural Resources
 Food and Drug Regulation
 Gaming
 Intellectual Property
 Internet and E-commerce
 Labour and Employment Law
 Licensing
 Life Sciences, Healthcare and Pharmaceuticals
 Private Investment Funds 
 Public Sector
 AdTech and Monetization
 Cyber Law
 Industrial Manufacturing 
 Financial Institutions 

 Specialist Practice Areas 
 China and Asia Pacific 
 Japan Practice
 Russia and CIS practice

References

External links
Herzog, Fox & Neeman Profile BDI Code- 2010

Law firms of Israel
Law firms established in 1972
1972 establishments in Israel
Partnerships